Peterborough is a town in the mid north of South Australia, in wheat country, just off the Barrier Highway. It was originally named Petersburg after the landowner, Peter Doecke, who sold land to create the town. It was one of 69 places in South Australia renamed in 1917 due to anti-German sentiments during World War I.

History
The first settlers in the area purchased land from the government in 1875. The first building in the town was constructed four years later. Settler Peter Doecke transferred his land to J H Koch in 1876, who found out in 1880 that the land would be the site of a railway junction. He subdivided it and sold  for £1700, after failing to get £500 per acre for it in 1879. By 1880 a hotel and post office had been erected, followed by a school in 1883, and a town hall in 1884.
At the prompting of mayor W. Thredgold, a newspaper, the Petersburg Times was founded in 1887 by Robert M. Osborne, became The Times and Northern Advertiser in 1919, under the longterm proprietorship of W. H. Bennett and survived as a family business until 1970.

Heritage listings

Peterborough has a number of heritage-listed sites, including:

 14 Bourke Street: Koch House
 2 Callary Street: Bishop's Palace and Convent, Peterborough
 2 Jervois Street: Peterborough Police Station, Cells and Courthouse
 77-79 Kitchener Street: Peterborough Power Station
 Main Street: Peterborough Rotunda
 105-107 Main Street: General Store, Peterborough
 106 Main Street Peterborough YMCA Hostel
 108 Main Street: Peterborough Town Hall
 193-195 Main Street: Peterborough Hotel
 227-231 Main Street: Capitol Theatre, Peterborough
 Railway Terrace: Peterborough Roundhouse and Turntable
 Tripney Avenue: Peterborough Gold Battery and Office

Government
Peterborough is the seat of the District Council of Peterborough. It is the largest town in the council area. Peterborough is in the state electorate of Stuart and federal Division of Grey. Peterborough at one point in time had its own town council (Corporation of the Town of Peterborough) surrounded by the district council.

Railways

Peterborough sat on the intersection of the East-West railway linking Port Pirie and Broken Hill, and the North–South railway linking Adelaide eventually to Alice Springs via Quorn, both narrow gauge lines between 1917 (when the Trans-Australian Railway opened across the Nullarbor Plain) and 1937 (when a more direct south–north route bypassed the Peterborough–Quorn railway line by connecting Port Pirie to Port Augusta). The Peterborough railway station is still in operation and was formerly a stop for the weekly Indian Pacific train.

The line from Port Pirie and Jamestown arrived in 1881, followed shortly after by the line from Terowie in the south and north to Quorn. The line to Broken Hill was completed in 1887.
Peterborough was the home town for Bob the Railway Dog who is remembered by a bronze statue located in the Main Street.

In 1970, the east–west line was converted to standard gauge, and the line south of Peterborough to Terowie to broad gauge. Thus Peterborough became one of three, triple-gauge railway junctions in Australia. The others being Gladstone and Port Pirie, all on the same railway corridor.

The broad-gauge connection to Adelaide, via Burra, was severed in the late 1980s. The narrow-gauge line north to Quorn last carried freight in 1980, and was removed, between Eurelia and Bruce in the mid-1980s. Grain trains ran as far as Orroroo into the mid-1980s. In its later years it was used by tourist trains from Steamtown as far as Eurelia. Steamtown ceased operations in 2002, however the roundhouse is still used to display its coaches and locomotives. The District Council, with funding from the three tiers of government and recovery of the Eurelia line, have subsequently established the Steamtown Heritage Rail Centre, with SA's first Sound & Light Show.

Nova Systems Space Precinct
In early 2022, the Nova Systems Space Precinct was officially established on a  site located just outside of Peterborough. Australian defence engineering and technology group Nova Systems originally purchased the site in 2019, when it contained one ground station terminal belonging to the site's previous owner, Tyvak. The site now hosts several ground stations on behalf of Tyvak (US), RBC Signals (US), and Leaf Space (Italy). Up to 75 more satellite dishes are planned, each with 16 antennae.

Media
The town was home to the Petersburg Times, subtitled: Orroroo Chronicle and Northern Advertiser, (12 August 1887 – May 1919). The Times''' subtitle later evolved to Terowie, Yongala, and Northern Advertiser, and finally Northern Advertiser. In 1919, the overall name was changed to The Times and Northern Advertiser, Peterborough, South Australia, in response to the government's wish to remove Germanic placenames.

Peterborough was also home to the short-lived newspaper, Petersburg Enterprise and Northern Advocate (20 January – 2 August 1912), which was printed by William John Myers and Walter A. Wade. Another short-lived publication was Frith's Bulletin (15 April 1913), a monthly magazine published by F.H. Frith, but discontinued after only one issue. A third one at this time was the Sporting Telegraph (3 May  – 26 July 1913), which was printed by W.H. Bennett for Pritchard Morgan Hall.

More recently, it was also home to the Peterborough Times (2003-2006), which later became part of the Mid North Broadcaster, a publication released from 2006 to 2013 in Burra. The Broadcaster was formed by the merger of struggling local newspapers, the Peterborough Times, the Burra Broadcaster (1991-2006), and the Eudunda Observer. It was owned by the Taylor group, with editorial control via the Murray Pioneer. Its distribution included the towns of Burra, Eudunda, Jamestown and Peterborough.

In mid-2021, a Temporary Community Broadcasting Licence (TCBL) was issued by the Australian Communications and Media Authority (ACMA) to Peterborough Community Broadcasting Incorporated. In early 2022, 5PBS commenced broadcasting on 91.1 MHz, servicing Peterborough and surrounding towns including Oodla Wirra, Terowie and Yongala.

Education
Peterborough High School was opened in 1927 and caters for students from years 8 to 12.

Peterborough Primary School was opened in 1883 and caters for students from years reception to 7.

St Joseph's School is a reception to Year 7 Catholic primary school which was founded by Mary MacKillop and the Sisters of St Joseph.

Gallery

References

Further reading
 Carson, Doris A., et al. "Transitioning from a local railway hub to a regional tourism system: The story of Peterborough, South Australia." in Perspectives on rural tourism geographies'' (Springer, Cham, 2019) pp. 173-196. online

External links

Steamtown
District Council of Peterborough
District Council of Peterborough Tourism
Peterborough Art & Cultural Festival

Towns in South Australia
Mid North (South Australia)